Kirk Fox (born August 26, 1969) is an American actor, screenwriter, and stand-up comedian.

Career

Television
Fox played Sewage Joe on Parks and Recreation and was a regular on Nickelodeon's How to Rock as Mr. March. Other credits include Community on NBC, Who Gets the Last Laugh? on TBS, Reservation Dogs on FX/Hulu, and Brooklyn Nine-Nine on Fox.

From 2013 to May 2014, Fox hosted CBS TV Distribution's syndicated  daytime talk show The Test.

Web series
In 2009, Fox and Owen Benjamin starred in Heckle U.

In 2012 and 2013, Fox starred as Melinda Hill's suitor in the first  and ninth  episodes of Romantic Encounters.

Stand-up comedy
In 2005, Fox co-wrote and co-starred in the comedy Tennis Anyone? with Donal Logue. On August 11, 2006, he made his television standup debut on Comedy Central's Live at Gotham and in 2007 received the Jury Prize for best standup at the HBO Comedy Festival in Aspen, Colorado.  In March 2008 he was featured in his own 1/2 hour special on Comedy Central: Comedy Central Presents: Kirk Fox. He appeared on The Tonight Show with Jay Leno in December 2008 and May 2009.

Personal life
Fox was born in San Diego, California in 1969. He was married to actress Alison Eastwood, the daughter of Clint Eastwood, for 10.5 months. They divorced in January 2000. Later, he mentioned on Dr. Phil's show that he married Jaren, a woman he met on Valentine's Day.

Filmography

Film
Treacherous (1993)
Wyatt Earp (1994)
In the Army Now (1994)
Criminal Hearts (1995)
The Trigger Effect (1996)
Infinity (1996)
The Postman (1997)
Crazy in Alabama (1999)
Mumford (1999)
The Patriot (2000)
The Right Temptation (2000)
City of Ghosts (2002)
Pauly Shore Is Dead (2003)
Tennis, Anyone...? (2005)
Natural Born Komics (2007) (V)
Forgetting Sarah Marshall (2008)
The Lodger (2009)
Heckle U (2009)
Still Waiting... (2009) (V)
A Heart Too Tender (2009)
Post Grad (2009)
Group Sex (2010)
Let Go (2011)
Any Day Now (2012)
Bulletproof 2 (2020)

Television
Martial Law (1999)
Nash Bridges (1998)
The Pretender (2000)
Deadwood (2005)
Live at Gotham (2006) 
Grand Union (2006)
Comedy Central Presents: Kirk Fox (2008) (TV)
Gaytown (2008)
Paris Hilton's My New BFF (2008)
The Tonight Show with Jay Leno (2008)
Chelsea Lately (2009) 
Reno 911! (2009) 
Parks and Recreation (2010)
Terriers (2010) 
Last Comic Standing (2010)
In Gayle We Trust (2011)
How to Rock (2012)
Community (2012)
Figure It Out (2012)
The Test (2013)
Rush Hour (2016)
The Mick (2017)
Brooklyn Nine-Nine (2018)
Reservation Dogs (2021)

References

External links

1969 births
Male actors from San Diego
American male comedians
American male film actors
American male television actors
Living people
Writers from San Diego
Comedians from California
20th-century American comedians
21st-century American comedians